Wael Sawan (born 1974) is a Lebanese-Canadian business executive, and the CEO of Shell plc since January 2023.

Early life
Sawan was born in Beirut in 1974. He grew up in Dubai, and earned a master's degree in chemical engineering from  McGill University in Canada. He took a career break and earned an MBA from Harvard Business School.

He has dual Lebanese and Canadian nationality.

Career
Sawan joined Shell in 1997 as an engineer with Petroleum Development Oman. In the mid-2000s he was country chair in Qatar, overseeing the planning and early stages of the Pearl Gas-to-Liquids (GtL) project. He rose to become head of Shell's integrated gas and renewables division, and succeeded Ben van Beurden as CEO on 1 January 2023.

Personal life
Sawan is married to Nicole, and they have three sons.

References

Living people
Chief Executive Officers of Shell plc
Directors of Shell plc
1974 births
McGill University Faculty of Engineering alumni
Lebanese chief executives
Canadian chief executives
People from Beirut
Harvard Business School alumni